Louisa County Courthouse is a historic courthouse building located at Louisa, Louisa County, Virginia. It was designed by   architect D. Wiley Anderson from Richmond and built in 1905.  It is a two-story, five-bay, porticoed Classical Revival brick structure.  It measures 59 feet wide and 63 feet deep and features a pedimented portico supported by four Ionic order columns.  It has a modified hipped roof topped by an octagonal drum, dome and lantern.  Associated with the courthouse is the contributing old jail built in 1818, and rebuilt in 1868 after a fire; the Crank Building (1830); R. Earl Ogg Memorial Building (1917); and a Civil War monument.

It was listed on the National Register of Historic Places in 1990.

References

Courthouses on the National Register of Historic Places in Virginia
County courthouses in Virginia
Neoclassical architecture in Virginia
Government buildings completed in 1905
Buildings and structures in Louisa County, Virginia
National Register of Historic Places in Louisa County, Virginia
1905 establishments in Virginia